Kamalapuram Assembly constituency is a constituency of the Andhra Pradesh Legislative Assembly, India. It is one of 7 constituencies in the YSR Kadapa district.

Pochimareddy Ravindranath Reddy of Yuvajana Sramika Rythu Congress Party  is currently representing the constituency.

Overview
It is part of the Kadapa Lok Sabha constituency along with another six Vidhan Sabha segments, namely, Badvel, Kadapa, Pulivendla, Jammalamadugu, Proddatur and Mydukur in YSR Kadapa district.

Mandals

Members of Legislative Assembly

Election results

Assembly elections 1952

Assembly Elections 1999

Assembly Elections 2004

Assembly Elections 2009

Assembly elections 2014

Assembly elections 2019

See also
 List of constituencies of Andhra Pradesh Legislative Assembly

References

Assembly constituencies of Andhra Pradesh